Stevens County (standard abbreviation: SV) is a county located in the U.S. state of Kansas. As of the 2020 census, the county population was 5,250. Its county seat is Hugoton. The county is named for the Reconstruction era Pennsylvania politician Thaddeus Stevens.

History

19th century
On July 25, 1888, the Hay Meadow Massacre was a violent county seat fight between groups from Hugoton and Woodsdale, where 4 men were murdered.

Geography

Major highways
 Kansas Highway 25
 Kansas Highway 51
 U.S. Highway 56

Adjacent counties
 Grant County (north)
 Haskell County (northeast)
 Seward County (east)
 Texas County, Oklahoma (south)
 Morton County (west)
 Stanton County (northwest)

National protected area
 Cimarron National Grassland (part)

Demographics

As of the census of 2000, there were 5,463 people, 1,988 households, and 1,457 families residing in the county.  The population density was 8 people per square mile (3/km2).  There were 2,265 housing units at an average density of 3 per square mile (1/km2).  The racial makeup of the county was 83.01% White, 0.93% Black or African American, 0.93% Native American, 0.24% Asian, 0.02% Pacific Islander, 13.25% from other races, and 1.61% from two or more races.  21.73% of the population were Hispanic or Latino of any race.

There were 1,988 households, out of which 38.80% had children under the age of 18 living with them, 63.10% were married couples living together, 7.10% had a female householder with no husband present, and 26.70% were non-families. 24.30% of all households were made up of individuals, and 12.10% had someone living alone who was 65 years of age or older.  The average household size was 2.72 and the average family size was 3.27.

In the county, the population was spread out, with 31.20% under the age of 18, 8.30% from 18 to 24, 27.80% from 25 to 44, 19.40% from 45 to 64, and 13.30% who were 65 years of age or older.  The median age was 34 years. For every 100 females there were 95.30 males.  For every 100 females age 18 and over, there were 92.50 males.

The median income for a household in the county was $41,830, and the median income for a family was $49,063. Males had a median income of $36,525 versus $22,803 for females. The per capita income for the county was $17,814.  About 8.30% of families and 10.30% of the population were below the poverty line, including 15.10% of those under age 18 and 4.70% of those age 65 or over.

Government

County
Stevens County is governed by the Stevens County Commissioners. The current members are Joe D. Thompson, Tron Stegman, and Pat Hall.

Presidential elections

Stevens County is overwhelmingly Republican. It has not been won by a Democrat at Presidential level since Lyndon Johnson won by fourteen votes in 1964. In fact, the last Democrat to crack thirty percent of the county's vote was Jimmy Carter in 1976, and since Carter only Michael Dukakis during the drought and farm crisis-influenced 1988 election has received so much as twenty percent.

Laws 
The Kansas Constitution was amended in 1986 to allow the sale of alcoholic liquor by the individual drink with the approval of voters, either with or without a minimum of 30% of sales coming from food. Stevens County is one of 35 counties in the state that allows for the sale of liquor by the drink without the minimum food sales stipulation.

Education

Unified school districts
 Moscow USD 209
 Hugoton USD 210

Communities

Cities
 Hugoton
 Moscow

Unincorporated communities
 Woodsdale

Townships
Stevens County is divided into six townships.  None of the cities within the county are considered governmentally independent, and all figures for the townships include those of the cities.  In the following table, the population center is the largest city (or cities) included in that township's population total, if it is of a significant size.

See also

References

Notes

Further reading

External links

County
 
 Stevens County - Directory of Public Officials
Other
 Hugoton Schools
Maps
 Stevens County Maps: Current, Historic, KDOT
 Kansas Highway Maps: Current, Historic, KDOT
 Kansas Railroad Maps: Current, 1996, 1915, KDOT and Kansas Historical Society

 
Kansas counties
1886 establishments in Kansas
Populated places established in 1886